Augustus of Saxe-Weissenfels (Dresden, 13 August 1614 – 4 June 1680, Halle), was a Duke of Saxe-Weissenfels-Querfurt of the House of Wettin and administrator of the Archbishopric of Magdeburg.

He was the fourth (but second surviving) son of John George I, Elector of Saxony, and his second wife, Magdalene Sibylle of Prussia.

Early life
On 23 January 1628, at the age of 13, August was appointed administrator of the Archbishopric of Magdeburg by its Chapter to replace the current holder of that title, Christian Wilhelm of Brandenburg. By that time, August had already served three years as coadjutor. Nevertheless, he could not assume his post: on 20 May 1631, after seven months of siege and plundering during the Sack of Magdeburg, the city was taken by the Imperial troops; the Catholic competitor for the diocese, Archduke Leopold Wilhelm of Austria, assumed the title of archbishop and administrator of Magdeburg. The Peace of Prague (1635) confirmed his rule over the city, but three years later, Swedish troops expelled the Habsburg army and restored August as administrator as of 19 October 1638. August finally took full control of Magdeburg on 31 December 1642 after a neutrality treaty was concluded with the Swedish general Lennart Torstenson.  He was then able to begin the reconstruction of the city.

In 1643 August was accepted into the Fruitbearing Society at the behest of Louis I, Prince of Anhalt-Köthen.

Duke of Saxe-Weissenfels
In his will of 20 July 1652, Elector John George I ordered a division of the Albertine territories that was carried out on 22 April 1657 in Dresden. August inherited the towns of Weißenfels and Querfurt and became their first duke.

August also increased his incomes by taking over the administration of the County of Barby during the minority of Count August Ludwig.  On 17 October 1659, however, the young count died shortly before attaining his majority. With him, the line of Barby became extinct. A dispute over his lands was resolved in favor of August seven years later (1666). In his will, the duke left Barby to his son Heinrich.

On 25 July 1660, August laid the first stone for his official residence, Schloss Neu-Augustusburg in Weissenfels. This castle was built in the same place as the old one, which had been devastated by Swedish troops. The duke died before the castle was finished.

On 15 July 1667, the sons of the late Duke Wilhelm of Saxe-Weimar offered August the presidency of the Fruitbearing Society. He accepted the office with its responsibility for fostering the work of artists and scientists. His activities as a patron left considerable debts for his descendants to deal with.

Marriages and issue
In Schwerin on 23 November 1647 August married Anna Maria of Mecklenburg-Schwerin. They had twelve children:

Magdalene Sibylle (b. Halle, 2 September 1648 - d. Gotha, 7 January 1681), married on 14 November 1669 to Duke Frederick I of Saxe-Gotha-Altenburg.
Johann Adolf I (b. Halle, 2 November 1649 - d. Weissenfels, 24 May 1697).
August (b. Halle, 3 December 1650 - d. Halle, 11 August 1674), Provost of Magdeburg; married on 25 August 1673 to Landgravine Charlotte of Hesse-Eschwege. Their only son was stillborn (24 April 1674).
Christian (b. Halle, 25 January 1652 - killed in action at Mainz, 24 August 1689), General Field Marshal of the Saxon Electoral Army.
Anna Maria (b. Halle, 28 February 1653 - d. Halle, 17 February 1671).
Sophie (b. Halle, 23 June 1654 - d. Zerbst, 31 March 1724), married on 18 June 1676 to Karl, Prince of Anhalt-Zerbst.
Katharine (b. Halle, 12 September 1655 - d. Halle, 21 April 1663).
Christine (b. Halle, 25 August 1656 - d. Eutin, 27 April 1698), married on 21 June 1676 to August Friedrich of Holstein-Gottorp, Prince-Bishop of Lübeck (son of Frederick III, Duke of Holstein-Gottorp, and his wife Duchess Marie Elisabeth of Saxony).
Heinrich (b. Halle, 29 September 1657 - d. Barby, 16 February 1728); he inherited Barby.
Albrecht (b. Halle, 14 April 1659 - d. Leipzig, 9 May 1692).
Elisabeth (b. Halle, 25 August 1660 - d. Halle, 11 May 1663).
Dorothea (b. Halle, 17 December 1662 - d. Halle, 12 May 1663).

In Halle on 29 January 1672, two years after the death of his first wife, August married Countess Johanna Walpurgis of Leiningen-Westerburg.  They had three sons:

 Frederick (b. Halle, 20 November 1673 - d. Dahme, 16 April 1715), he inherited Dahme.
Maurice (b. Halle, 5 January 1676 - d. Szeged, Hungary, 12 September 1695).
Stillborn son (1679).

References
Johann Christoph von Dreyhaupt: Beschreibung des … Saal-Creyses, insonderheit der Städte Halle; Halle 1749/1751 (Dreyhaupt-Chronik)
Heinrich Theodor Flathe: August (Herzog von Sachsen-Weißenfels). In: Allgemeine Deutsche Biographie (ADB), vol. 1, Duncker & Humblot, Leipzig 1875, p. 680.
Klaus Gondermann: Die Mitglieder der Fruchtbringenden Gesellschaft 1617–1650: 527 Biographien, Leipzig, 1985.
Boje E. Schmuhl (ed.) jointly with Thomas Bauer-Friedrich: Im Land der Palme. August von Sachsen (1614-1680), Erzbischof von Magdeburg und Fürst in Halle. Kunstmuseum Moritzburg, Halle (Saale) 2014 (writings of the Kunstmuseums Moritzburg Halle (Saale), vol. 2).
Hellmut Kretzschmar: August. In: Neue Deutsche Biographie (NDB). vol. 1, Duncker & Humblot, Berlin 1953. Online [retrieved 10 October 2014].
Dirk Schleinert: Anna Maria von Mecklenburg (1627-1669) und August von Sachsen (1614-1680) und die Begründung des Hauses Sachsen-Weißenfels. Dynastische Beziehungen zwischen Mecklenburg und Kursachsen im 17. Jahrhundert, in: Mecklenburgische Jahrbücher 123. Jg. (2008), pp. 123–157.
300 Jahre Schloß Neu-Augustusburg, 1660–1694 – Residenz der Herzöge von Sachsen-Weißenfels. Festschrift, Weissenfels 1994.
Andrea Thiele: Residenz auf Abruf? Hof- und Stadtgesellschaft in Halle (Saale) unter dem letzten Administrator des Erzstifts Magdeburg, August von Sachsen (1614-1680). Halle (Saale) 2011 (=research on Halle city's history; nº16).
Andrea Thiele: Vier Jahrzehnte in Halle - Die Saalestadt als Residenz Augusts von Sachsen, postulierter Administrator des Erzstifts Magdeburg (1614-1680). in: Barocke Fürstenresidenzen an Saale, Unstrut und Elster, pp. 122–132; Michael Imhof ed., Petersberg 2007.
Joachim Säckl/Andrea Thiele: August von Sachsen, Administrator des Erzstifts Magdeburg, Herzog von Sachsen-Weißenfels (* 13. August 1614 in Dresden, + 4. Juni 1680 in Halle/Saale). In: Mitteldeutsches Yearbook of Culture and History, Vol. 21 (2014), pp. 272–275.

1614 births
1680 deaths
House of Saxe-Weissenfels
Nobility from Dresden
Lutheran bishops and administrators of German prince-bishoprics
Dukes of Saxe-Weissenfels
Albertine branch